Dhami may also refer to:

Dhami, Nepal, a village
Dhami (surname)
Dhami State, a former princely state located in modern-day Himachal Pradesh

See also
Dami (disambiguation)